GGAB may refer to:
GGAB, The Girl Guides Association of Barbados
GGAB, The Girl Guides Association of Bahrain